The FIBA Africa Championship 1964 was the second FIBA Africa Championship regional basketball championship held by FIBA Africa, which also served as Africa qualifier for the 1964 Summer Olympics, giving a berth to champion. It was held in Morocco between 4 March and 8 March 1964. Six national teams entered the event under the auspices of FIBA Africa, the sport's regional governing body. The city of Casablanca hosted the tournament. The United Arab Republic won the title after finishing in first place of the round robin group.

Results 
All six teams competed in a round robin group that defined the final standings. The United Arab Republic qualified for the 1964 Summer Olympics as winner of the tournament.

|}

External links 
 1964 African Championship for Men, FIBA.com.

1964 in Moroccan sport
 
AfroBasket
International basketball competitions hosted by Morocco
March 1964 sports events in Africa